"A Springfield Summer Christmas for Christmas" is the 10th episode of the thirty-second season of the American animated television series The Simpsons, and the 694th episode overall. It aired in the United States on Fox on December 13, 2020. The episode was directed by Timothy Bailey and written by Jessica Conrad.

The episode, which parodies Hallmark Christmas movies, focuses on Mary Tannenbaum (played by guest star Ellie Kemper), a Heartmark executive who travels to Springfield to produce a Christmas movie. There she ends up falling for Principal Seymour Skinner. Richard Kind and Chris Parnell also guest-star as the film's director and Mary's surgeon fiancé, respectively.

Plot 
Movie producer Mary Tannenbaum comes to shoot a Christmas movie in Springfield, despite her dislike of Christmas movies. While she stays with the Simpsons, Lisa tries to get behind the scenes to film a documentary about the movie, Marge tries to befriend Mary, Homer attempts to make money off her stay, and Bart is upset when Homer rents the family bedrooms out to Mary and the film crew.

In a café, Mary meets Seymour Skinner, who later tries to take down the props of the set to set up for his annual Lettuce and Tomato Festival. Mary makes a deal with the principal, offering to help make sure his festival happens on time, if he helps build the sets for the movie. But when Mary is finally ready to return to the big city, she gets a call from her boss saying that she will be passed over for an important promotion unless she stays in Springfield to help finish the film. When Homer hears that Mary needs fake snow for her movie, he grinds up anything that is white into flaky powder to sell to her. Mary realizes she might be falling in love with Skinner instead of her handsome surgeon fiancé.

Soon after, Mary must use the Lettuce and Tomato festival as the set of the big finale scene in her movie, and Skinner yells at her for turning his project into a Christmas-themed party. At the same time, Bart tries to get his room back by turning on the fake snow machine and spraying the set with Homer's fake snow. Mary and Skinner get trapped in a pile of the stuff and bond until Skinner digs his way out. However, when Bart reveals Lisa's documentary footage of Mary badmouthing Springfield, the town turns on her and refuses to be extras in the movie, and the set is destroyed by a fire.

Mary confesses to Marge that she has always hated Christmas movies since her father died in the making of Jingle All the Way when she was a child. Skinner convinces the town to continue work on the movie, to Mary's joy. In the end, Mary chooses Skinner over her fiancé, but Skinner convinces her to return to her fiancé.

Production

Casting 
Ellie Kemper appeared in the episode as Mary Tannenbaum, a producer for the Heartmark Channel trying to get a promotion by filming a Christmas movie in Springfield, and Richard Kind appeared as Director of the movie Mary is shooting. In addition, Chris Parnell appears as Mary Tannenbaum's handsome surgeon fiancé, who Mary slightly dislikes.

Development 
On 2020, Fox released nine promotional pictures from the episode.

Reception

Viewing figures 
In the United States, the episode was watched live by 3.92 million viewers.

Critical response 
Tony Sokol of Den of Geek said that the episode was a "masterful send-up of holiday movies, demographically charged programming, and Christmas itself." He gave the episode 4.5/5 stars.

References

2020 American television episodes
The Simpsons (season 32) episodes
American Christmas television episodes
Television episodes about filmmaking
Hallmark Channel